Mexicana Universal Nayarit, formerly called Nuestra Belleza Nayarit is a beauty pageant held in Nayarit, Mexico, that selects that state's representative for the national Mexicana Universal pageant. The state has produced two national winners of Mexicana Internacional (2016 and 2019).

In 2000, the state was not represented at the national pageant.

Titleholders
Below are the names of the annual titleholders of Nuestra Belleza Nayarit 1994-2016, Mexicana Universal Nayarit 2017, and their final placements in the Mexicana Universal.

1 She was selected by Mexicana Universal Organization to represent Mexico in Miss Charm International beauty pageant.

Designated contestants
As of 2000, isn't uncommon for some States to have more than one delegate competing simultaneously in the national pageant. The following Nuestra Belleza Nayarit contestants were invited to compete in Nuestra Belleza México.

 Competed in Miss Universe.
 Competed in Miss International.
 Competed in Miss Charm International.
 Competed in Miss Continente Americano.
 Competed in Reina Hispanoamericana.
 Competed in Miss Orb International.
 Competed in Nuestra Latinoamericana Universal.

External links
Official website

Nuestra Belleza México